Urban Regeneration Companies are private companies in the United Kingdom that seek to achieve a radical physical transformation of their areas through masterplanning and co-ordinating financial assistance to developers from both the public and private sector..

The companies 
 1st East for Lowestoft and Great Yarmouth
 Bradford Centre Regeneration in Bradford
 Catalyst Corby in Corby
 Central Salford in Salford
 CPR Regeneration for Camborne, Pool and Redruth in Cornwall
 Derby Cityscape in Derby
 Gloucester Heritage in Gloucester
 Hull Citybuild in Kingston upon Hull
 Leicester Regeneration Company in Leicester
 Liverpool Vision in Liverpool
 New East Manchester in Manchester
 Newport Unlimited in Newport
 Opportunity Peterborough in Peterborough
 ReBlackpool in Blackpool
 Regenco in Sandwell
 Renaissance Southend in Southend
 Sheffield One in Sheffield
 Sunderland Arc in Sunderland
 Tees Valley Regeneration for the Tees Valley
 The New Swindon Company in Swindon
 Walsall Regeneration Company in Walsall
 West Lakes Renaissance for the Lake District.

External links
 Urban Regeration Companies
 English Partnerships - URCs in England
 Office of the Deputy Prime Minister - URCs